Patricia Elaine Campbell-Smith (born 1966) is a judge of the United States Court of Federal Claims and former Chief Special Master of that court. She served as Chief Judge from October 21, 2013 to March 13, 2017.

Biography

Campbell-Smith was born in 1966 in Baltimore, Maryland. She received a Bachelor of Science degree, cum laude, in Electrical Engineering in 1987, from Duke University. She received a Juris Doctor, cum laude, in 1992, from Tulane Law School. She then served as a law clerk for Judge Martin Leach-Cross Feldman  and as a law clerk for Judge Sarah S. Vance of the United States District Court for the Eastern District of Louisiana.  Campbell-Smith then worked at the law firm of Liskow & Lewis in New Orleans, Louisiana. From 1998 to 2005 she served as a career law clerk for Judge Emily C. Hewitt of the United States Court of Federal Claims. She became a Special Master of the United States Court of Federal Claims in 2005 and Chief Special Master in 2011, serving in that role until she was confirmed to the court in 2013.

Claims Court service

On March 19, 2013, President Barack Obama nominated Campbell-Smith to serve as a judge of the United States Court of Federal Claims, to the seat vacated by Judge Lawrence Baskir, who retired April 1, 2013. The Senate Judiciary Committee held a hearing on her nomination on May 8, 2013, and reported her nomination to the floor by voice vote on June 6, 2013. The Senate confirmed her nomination by voice vote on September 17, 2013. She received her commission on September 19, 2013 and took the oath of office the same day. Her commission will expire on September 18, 2028, and her term will end that day, unless she is reappointed. On October 21, 2013 President Barack Obama designated Campbell-Smith to serve as Chief Judge of the United States Court of Federal Claims.  She served as Chief Judge until March 13, 2017, when she was succeeded in that position by Judge Susan G. Braden.

Notable cases
Following the shutdown of the federal government in 2013, Campbell-Smith ruled that the federal government violated federal labor law and may owe damages to employees affected by the shutdown. If employees seek damages, the ruling could raise the cost of the shutdown significantly.

References

External links 

United States Court of Federal Claims page on Patricia Elaine Campbell-Smith

|-

1966 births
African-American judges
African-American women lawyers
African-American lawyers
Duke University Pratt School of Engineering alumni
Judges of the United States Court of Federal Claims
Living people
Lawyers from Baltimore
Tulane University Law School alumni
United States Article I federal judges appointed by Barack Obama
21st-century American judges
21st-century American women judges